George Thomas Montgomery (December 30, 1847 – January 10, 1907) was an American prelate of the Catholic Church. He was the first American-born Bishop of Monterey-Los Angeles (1896-1902) and later served as Coadjutor Archbishop of San Francisco from 1902 until his death in 1907.

Early life and education
Montgomery was born on December 30, 1847, on a farm in Daviess County, Kentucky, near Owensboro. He was one of nine children of Pius Michael and Harriet Elizabeth (née Warren) Montgomery; his uncle was Zachariah Montgomery and his cousin, Zachariah's son, was John Joseph Montgomery. His mother died of typhoid fever when he was 10 years old and he was raised by an aunt, Margaret Montgomery Head.

Montgomery worked in farming until 1867, when he entered Cecilian College, an all-male boarding school near Elizabethtown. After deciding to enter the priesthood, he was sponsored by his uncle Zachariah, who had moved to California, as a student for the Archdiocese of San Francisco. He attended St. Charles College in Ellicott City, Maryland, from 1871 to 1875 and completed his studies at St. Mary's Seminary in Baltimore.

Priesthood
While in Baltimore, Montgomery was ordained a priest on December 20, 1879, by Archbishop James Gibbons. After arriving in San Francisco, he was appointed secretary to Archbishop Joseph Sadoc Alemany. When Patrick William Riordan succeeded Alemany in 1884, he retained Montgomery as secretary and also named him chancellor of the archdiocese.

In San Francisco, Montgomery became known as "one of the foremost temperance advocates that California has ever known," and described alcohol as "not only debauching our young men and women, not only affecting the individual as an individual, but as a citizen—a factor of society." In 1886, he established a local chapter of the League of the Cross, which encouraged young men to abstain from alcohol until they turned 21. By 1894, the San Francisco league grew to a membership of 4,000.

Episcopal career

Los Angeles
On January 26, 1894, Montgomery was appointed coadjutor bishop with the right of succession to Francisco Mora y Borrell, the Bishop of Monterey-Los Angeles. He was also given the honorary title of titular bishop of Thmuis. He received his episcopal consecration on the following April 8 from Archbishop Riordan, with Bishops Jean-Baptiste Brondel and Lawrence Scanlan serving as co-consecrators.

Montgomery assisted Mora with the management of diocesan affairs until the latter's resignation, becoming the first American-born Bishop of Monterey-Los Angeles on May 6, 1896. In response to the growing influence of the anti-Catholic American Protective Association in Los Angeles, he organized a branch of the Catholic Truth Society in 1896.

When it came to more secular issues, Montgomery believed, "If ever the respective rights and duties of labor and capital are to be even properly defined, it must be upon the principles which religion lays down." In 1899, he was invited to attend a public address by the socialist political leader Eugene V. Debs. During the address, Debs pointed to an American flag over his head and said, "These very stars and stripes, our emblem of liberty, are manufactured in a sweatshop"; when it was Montgomery's turn to speak, the bishop declared, "If that flag was made in a sweatshop, it floats over the freest country on the face of the earth."

San Francisco
On September 17, 1902, Montgomery was appointed coadjutor archbishop of San Francisco, with the right of succession to his former superior Archbishop Riordan, as well as titular archbishop of Axum.

At the time of the 1906 San Francisco earthquake, Riordan was away on travel and it was Montgomery who led the Archdiocese's immediate response to the disaster and helped extinguish a fire at St. Mary's Cathedral. A few days later, he wrote to his successor in Los Angeles, Thomas James Conaty, to say "I do not know how I have lived through [it]" and to praise the “good humor, the common interest, and forgetfulness of self that are everywhere."

Despite a history of poor health, Montgomery died unexpectedly from complications with appendicitis and diabetes on January 10, 1907. He is buried at Holy Cross Cemetery in Colma, California.

References

1847 births
1907 deaths
20th-century Roman Catholic bishops in the United States
Roman Catholic Archdiocese of Los Angeles
19th-century Roman Catholic bishops in the United States
Roman Catholic Archdiocese of San Francisco
1906 San Francisco earthquake survivors
People from Anderson County, Kentucky
Catholics from California
Catholics from Kentucky